Tarik Carson da Silva (Rivera, Uruguay, 23 August 1946 - Argentina, 29 September 2014) was a Uruguayan-born writer and painter, active in Argentina.

Work

Novels 
 Una pequeña soledad (Filofalsía, Buenos Aires, 1986) 
 El estado superior de la materia (Buenos Aires, 1989)
 Ganadores (Proyección, Montevideo, 1991) 
 Océanos de néctar (Axxón, Buenos Aires, 1992)

Short stories 
 El hombre olvidado (Géminis, Montevideo, 1973) 
 El corazón reversible (Monte Sexto, Montevideo, 1986)

References

Uruguayan painters
Uruguayan science fiction writers
Argentine science fiction writers
1946 births
2014 deaths